Connor Bell (born 15 July 1996) is an English professional footballer who plays as a striker in Australia for Preston Lions FC in the National Premier Leagues Victoria 2.

Career
In the summer of 2017, Bell joined Scottish Championship side Inverness Caledonian Thistle after a spell in Switzerland playing for Servette's under-21 side in the fifth-tier of Swiss football where he scored six goals in 16 matches.

Bell then joined Greenock Morton in the summer of 2018 and scored on his debut against Albion Rovers.

In February 2019, having been released by Greenock Morton in the previous month, Bell signed for Evo-Stik Northern Premier League side South Shields. He scored his first goal for the club in a 4–1 over Hednesford Town

In June 2019, Bell moved to Australia, signing for Victorian State League Division 1 side Preston Lions FC. In his first half-season at the club, Bell won the championship with Preston, scoring 3 goals in 8 games.

Having joined Whitby Town in October 2019, he moved back to Preston in December, before linking up with Dunston UTS in October 2020.

With the season being cut short, Bell bagged one goal in three games, with his sole strike winning Dunston three points in a 4-3 victory against Brighouse Town.

He moved to Northern Premier League East Division rivals, Hebburn Town, in July 2021.

In January 2022, He moved to Australia for his old club Preston Lions for NPL Victoria 3 in 2022 seasons.

Honours
Inverness Caledonian Thistle
Scottish Challenge Cup : 2017–18

References

External links

1996 births
Association football forwards
English footballers
Expatriate footballers in Switzerland
Greenock Morton F.C. players
Inverness Caledonian Thistle F.C. players
Living people
Cymru Premier players
Rhyl F.C. players
Rotherham United F.C. players
Scottish Professional Football League players
Servette FC players
Sunderland A.F.C. players
Wrexham A.F.C. players
South Shields F.C. (1974) players
Preston Lions FC players
Whitby Town F.C. players
Dunston UTS F.C. players
Hebburn Town F.C. players
English expatriate footballers
2. Liga Interregional players
English expatriate sportspeople in Switzerland